Pandora's Clock (also known as Doomsday Virus) is a 1996 NBC miniseries based on a novel by John J. Nance about a deadly virus on a Boeing 747-200 from Frankfurt to John F. Kennedy International Airport. Directed by Eric Laneuville, the film stars Richard Dean Anderson, Stephen Root, Jane Leeves, Robert Loggia and Daphne Zuniga and the script closely follows the book.

Plot 
The story begins in the mountains of Bavaria, Germany, where wildlife documentarian Ernest Helms (Michael Winters) is filming local wildlife. While filming, he discovers a man attempting to break into his rental car. After foiling the man's attempt, Helms prepares to drive away but is thwarted by the man smashing the driver's window. Helms, however, succeeds in escaping the crazed man, but receives a minor cut on his hand.

A few days later, in Frankfurt, Captain James Holland (Richard Dean Anderson), amidst preparations for his forthcoming transatlantic flight as Captain of Quantum Airlines Flight 66, is told by his doctor he does not have cancer. On board Flight 66, a Boeing 747-200, Helms (already displaying signs of illness) is assisted to his seat by flight attendant Brenda Hopkins (Kate Hodge). Shortly after takeoff, Helms rises from his seat and falls into cardiac arrest, and Brenda gives him CPR. Head flight attendant Barb Rollins (Jennifer Savidge) notifies Holland of the emergency, and the Captain and his check pilot, Daniel Robb (Richard Lawson) set a course for London's Heathrow Airport,.  However they are turned away when British Air-Traffic Control informs them that one of the passengers (Helms) could be infected with a deadly strain of influenza.

Several harrowing events follow. The U.S. President (Edward Herrmann) unsuccessfully tries to sneak Flight 66 into RAF Mildenhall, disguised as a United States Air Force fighter plane and guided in by another, despite a recommendation otherwise by Ambassador Lee Lancaster (Robert Guillaume), but the British forces at the base jam the runway with emergency vehicles.   Holland threatens to land anyway, only to pull up at the last minute, showing the U.S. Government how desperate the situation is.  Soon thereafter,  an investigation is set in motion by the Central Intelligence Agency. Flight 66 lands at the U.S. air base in Iceland, but one passenger is so distraught at being separated from her child and at being in quarantine that she runs down the airplane stairs and is shot and killed by U.S. troops in MOPP gear.  Holland flies the aircraft toward Mauritania, but a female intelligence agent warns Holland that an assassin is trying to destroy the flight.  Holland tricks the assassin (in a missile-armed Learjet 35) into crashing and lands on Ascension Island.

The book mentions that the virus becomes less lethal and enters the human population.  The movie indicates that the flight attendant who gave Helms CPR died six months after the incident, presumably from the virus.

Cast
 Richard Dean Anderson as Captain James Holland
 Robert Guillaume as Ambassador Lee Lancaster
 Edward Herrmann as President of the United States Ersin
 Kate Hodge as Brenda Hopkins
 Jane Leeves as Rachel Sherwood
 Richard Lawson as Captain Daniel Robb
 Robert Loggia as CIA Director Jonathan Roth
 Stephen Root as Mark Hastings
 Vladimir Kulich as Yuri
 Daphne Zuniga as Dr. Roni Sanders
 John Considine as Dr. Turnheir
 Grant Goodeve as Don Moses
 Wolf Muser as Dr. Zeitner
 John J. Nance as Air Force Chief
 Penny Peyser as Lisa Erickson

Award nominations

References

External links
 
 

1996 films
1996 television films
1996 drama films
1990s American television miniseries
American aviation films
American disaster films
Films scored by Don Davis (composer)
Films about aviation accidents or incidents
Films about viral outbreaks
Films based on American novels
Films directed by Eric Laneuville
Films set on Ascension Island
Films set in Bavaria
Films set in Frankfurt
Films set in Iceland
Films set in London
Films set in Suffolk
NBC network original films
1990s English-language films
1990s American films